Məscidməhəllə (also, Meçidməhlə, Məsçitməhəllə, Mechet’ Megla, Mechet’maglya, and Mechet’makhla) is a village and municipality in the Astara Rayon of Azerbaijan.  It has a population of 1,046.

References 

Populated places in Astara District